The chairman of the Board of Governors of the Federal Reserve System is the head of the Federal Reserve, and is the active executive officer of the Board of Governors of the Federal Reserve System. The chairman shall preside at the meetings of the Board.

The chairman serves a four-year term after being nominated by the president of the United States and confirmed by the United States Senate; the officeholder serves concurrently as member of the Board of Governors. The chairman may serve multiple terms, pending a new nomination and confirmation at the end of each term, with William McChesney Martin as the longest serving chair from 1951 to 1970 and Alan Greenspan as a close second. The president may not have the legal authority to dismiss a chairman before the end of a term, although this assumption has never been tested in court.

The current chairman is Jerome Powell, who was sworn in on February 5, 2018. He was nominated to the position by President Donald Trump on November 2, 2017, and later confirmed by the Senate. He was subsequently nominated to a second term by President Joe Biden, later confirmed by the Senate and sworn in on May 23, 2022.

Appointment process 

As stipulated by the Banking Act of 1935, the president may designate to serve as Chairman of the Board for four-year terms with the advice and consent of the Senate, from among the sitting governors. The Senate Committee responsible for vetting a Federal Reserve chair nominee is the Senate Committee on Banking.

Duties of the Fed chairman  
By law, at meetings of the Board the chairman shall preside, and, in his absence, the vice chairman shall preside. In the absence of the chairman and the vice chairman, the Board shall elect a member to act as chairman pro tempore.

Under the chairman’s leadership, the Board’s responsibilities include analysis of domestic and international financial and economic developments. The board also supervises and regulates the Federal Reserve Banks, exercises responsibility in the nation’s payments system, and administers consumer credit protection laws.

One of the chairman’s most important duties is to serve as the chair of the Federal Open Market Committee (FOMC), which is critical in setting short-term U.S. monetary policy.

By law, the chairman reports twice a year to Congress on the Federal Reserve's monetary policy objectives. He or she also testifies before Congress on numerous other financial issues and meets periodically with the treasury secretary, who is a member of the president's Cabinet.

Conflict of interest law 
The law applicable to the chair and all other members of the board provides (in part):

Salary
Chair of the Federal Reserve is a Level I position in the Executive Schedule, thus earning the salary prescribed for that level (US$226,300, as of January 2022).

List of Fed chairs
The following is a list of past and present chairs of the Board of Governors of the Federal Reserve System. A chair serves for a four-year term after appointment, but may be reappointed for several consecutive four-year terms. Since the Federal Reserve was established in 1914, the following people have served as chair.

See also

 History of central banking in the United States

Notes

References

Further reading
 
 
 Beckhart, Benjamin Haggott. 1972. Federal Reserve System. [New York]: American Institute of Banking.
 Shull, Bernard. 2005. The fourth branch: the Federal Reserve's unlikely rise to power and influence. Westport, Conn.: Praeger.

External links

 
 Public Statements of the Chairs of the Board of Governors of the Federal Reserve System, via the St. Louis Federal Reserve Bank
 Nomination hearings, conducted in the Senate, for Chairs and Members of the Board of Governors of the Federal Reserve System
 Timeline of Federal Reserve Chairs with related resources

 
United States